The 2017 Carlow Senior Football Championship is the 117th edition of the Carlow GAA's premier club gaelic football tournament for senior graded clubs in County Carlow, Ireland. The tournament consists of 8 teams, with the winner going on to represent Carlow in the Leinster Senior Club Football Championship. The championship starts with a group stage and then progresses to a knock out stage.

Palatine were the defending champions after they defeated Rathvilly in the previous years final to claim a "2-in-a-row" of titles, however their chances of a hat-trick of titles was thwarted by Éire Óg at the semi-final stage.

This was the St Andrew's return to the senior grade after claiming the 2016 Carlow Intermediate Football Championship title, thus ending a 3-year exodus since being relegated in 2013.

O'Hanrahans were relegated to the 2018 I.F.C. after just a 2-year stint in the top-flight when losing to Mt. Leinster Rangers in a relegation play off final.

Team changes
The following teams have changed division since the 2016 championship season.

To S.F.C.
Promoted from 2016 Carlow Intermediate Football Championship
 St Andrew's  -  (Intermediate Champions)

From S.F.C.
Relegated to 2017 Carlow Intermediate Football Championship
 Kildavin/Clonegal

Group stage

There are two groups of four teams. The top two teams in each group compete in the semi-finals. The bottom team in each group compete in the relegation Final.

Group A

Round 1
 Old Leighlin 0-9, 0-8 Mt. Leinster Rangers, 29/7/2017,
 Palatine 2-15, 1-12 Tinryland, 3/8/2017,

Round 2
 Palatine 2-13, 0-13 Old Leighlin, 12/8/2017,
 Tinryland 4-7, 0-9 Mt. Leinster Rangers, 13/8/2017,

Round 3
 Palatine 3-19, 0-6 Mt. Leinster Rangers, 26/8/2017,
 Old Leighlin 1-10, 0-8 Tinryland, 27/8/2017,

Group B

Round 1
 Éire Óg 1-20, 0-6 St Andrew's, 28/7/2017,
 Rathvilly 0-16, 0-11 O'Hanrahans, 29/7/2017,

Round 2
 Éire Óg 3-18, 0-12 O'Hanrahans, 11/8/2017,
 Rathvilly 0-15, 1-11 St Andrew's, 13/8/2017,

Round 3
 Rathvilly 0-15, 0-13 Éire Óg, 27/8/2017, 
 St Andrew's 1-17, 0-9 O'Hanrahans, 27/8/2017,

Knock-out stages

Finals
The winners and runners up of each group qualify for the quarter finals.

Quarter-finals

Semi-finals

Final

Relegation play off

The bottom team in each group compete in the relegation final. The team to lose will be relegated to the 2018 I.F.C.

Relegation Final:
 Mt. Leinster Rangers 3-9, 3-7 O'Hanrahans, Dr Cullen Park, 16/9/2017,

Leinster Senior Club Football Championship

References

 
 

Carlow Senior Football Championship
Carlow Senior Football Championship